Sabrina Ferilli (born 28 June 1964) is an Italian theater and film actress. Considered to be one of the best Italian actresses, she has won five Nastro d'Argento (including a special award in 2016 for civil engagement for her performance in Me, Myself and Her), a Globo d'oro, six Ciak d'oros and received four nominations for David di Donatello. In 2013, she was a protagonist of the Oscar-winning film La grande bellezza directed by Paolo Sorrentino.

Early and personal life 
Ferilli was born in Rome on 28 June 1964. Her father was also from Rome and a spokesman for the Italian Communist Party in the region of Lazio and her mother, who grew up in Fiano Romano, was a housewife and native of Caserta, Southern Italy. She attended the Liceo Clasico Orazio ("Orazio classical high school") in Rome. After having unsuccessfully attempted to enter the Centro Sperimentale di Cinematografia in Rome, she began her career as a film actress in secondary parts, acting in Sweets from a Stranger by Franco Ferrini, and small roles in second-tier films at the end of 1980s.

Ferilli was married to Italian lawyer Andrea Perone from 2003 to 2005. Since 2011, she has been married to manager Flavio Cattaneo.

Acting career 
In 1990 Alessandro D'Alatri cast her in a small role for the movie Red American. In 1993 she appeared in the comedy Anche i commercialisti hanno un'anima''' alongside Enrico Montesano and Renato Pozzetto, Il giudice ragazzino with Giulio Scarpati and in Marco Ferreri's Diario di un vizio. The following year she had a breakthrough role in The Beautiful Life by Paolo Virzì, which won her the Silver Ribbon for Best Actress, Best Supporting Actress. During the following years he has been involved in the movie Ricky Tognazzi and continues to appear in good comedies, such as Ferie d'agosto always of Virzì and  Return to Home Gori  of Alessandro Benvenuti. He conducted Sanremo Festival 1996 along with Pippo Baudo and Valeria Mazza. Two years later, he has been co-starred in the dramatic film  You Laughter and the comedy  Francesco Nuti.

She later also worked in theater in some productions of Garinei and Giovannini comedies, including  Rugantino and Let's Try More and made appearances in some television comedies. In 2000, she modeled for a Max calendar, which has sold over 1 million copies. On 24 June 2001, to celebrate the scudetto for A.S. Roma, she performed a dance at Circus Maximus in front of hundreds of thousands of fans. She had a lead role in the controversial 2003 film The Water ... the Fire by Luciano Emmer which debuted at the Venice Film Festival.

She later participated in several Italian Christmas comedies known as "cinepanettoni": Christmas in Love, Christmas in New York, Christmas in Beverly Hills and Christmas Holiday to Cortina. She defended her work in less serious films by saying, "How do you call them? Cinepanettoni? Well, then I'm happy to be associated with it because I love panettons, turrus and pandora."

In 2008, she appeared in Virzì's Your Whole Life Ahead of You, once again winning the Silver Ribbon. In 2013, she was chosen as a judge in the twelfth edition of Friends of Maria De Filippi and also appeared in the subsequent season. In the same year, she starred in Eros Puglielli' TV series We Kiss Our Hands – Palermo New York 1958 on Canale 5, and was chosen as the opening presenter of the Roma Film Festival. Her 2013 performance as one of the protagonists in The Great Beauty by Paolo Sorrentino helped the film to win the Oscar for Best Foreign Film Best Foreign Film on 2 March 2014. In December 2014, she debuted on the new Agon Channel with the talk show Contratto with Luca Zanforlin. On 11 April 2015, she appeared in the fourteenth edition of "Amici di Maria De Filippi" with Francesco Renga and Loredana Bertè.

In 2015, she starred with Margherita Buy in Io e lei by Maria Sole Tognazzi, a lesbian retelling of Edouard Molinaro's Il vizietto''. The actress said she was very happy to have participated in a movie like this: "In a bigoted country like ours "Me and Her" can be important because it is a story that is not scary, to divide. I like to call it a homosexual story because the point of strength of this relationship is not gender, but feelings." She was awarded a Golden Ciak at Best Actress for the film and was nominated for the David of Donatello for Best Actress Starring David of Donatello and Silver Ribbon for Best Actress Starring.

Beginning 2 April 2016, she was again in the jury of the 15th edition of "Amici di Maria De Filippi" with singers Anna Oxa and Loredana Bertè.

Filmography

Films

Television

Stage

References

External links 
  
 

1964 births
Living people
Actresses from Rome
Italian stage actresses
Italian film actresses
Nastro d'Argento winners
Ciak d'oro winners
20th-century Italian actresses
21st-century Italian actresses
People of Campanian descent
Childfree